Qiasabad-e Olya (also Romanized as Qīāsābād-e ‘Olyā; also known as Qīāsābād-e Bālā and Ghīās̄ābād-e Bālā) is a village in Kenevist Rural District, in the Central District of Mashhad County, Razavi Khorasan Province, Iran. At the 2006 census, its population was 155, in 47 families.

References 

Populated places in Mashhad County